Sportklub is a subscription sports television service which has been broadcast in Bosnia and Herzegovina, Montenegro, Serbia and Slovenia since 2006, Croatia from 2007 and in North Macedonia from 2011. A different version of the channel has also been available in Poland since 2006.

Sportklub broadcasts many different sporting events including football, basketball, tennis, American football, ice hockey, volleyball, handball, athletics, and golf among others. The programmes are transmitted in Serbian, Croatian, Slovenian, Macedonian, and Albanian.

The channel was launched by IKO Media Group in 2006, and was later sold to various companies. It was formerly available in Hungary (2006–2015) and Romania (2006–2012).

Coverage

Football
 FIFA World Cup qualification (only Croatia and Slovenia for UEFA qualifiers)
 UEFA Champions League (Slovenia only, 2021–2024)
 UEFA Europa League (Slovenia only, 2021–2024)
 UEFA Europa Conference League (Slovenia only, 2021–2024)
 UEFA Super Cup (Slovenia only, 2021–2024)
 UEFA European Championship qualifying (only Croatia and Slovenia)
 UEFA Nations League (only Croatia and Slovenia)

CONCACAF

 CONCACAF Champions League
 CONCACAF Nations League 

CAF

 CAF Champions League

AFC
 AFC Champions League
 AFC Cup

Leagues:

Cups:

Basketball
FIBA
 2023 FIBA Basketball World Cup qualification
 2023 FIBA Basketball World Cup

Leagues:

Cups:

Tennis
 Wimbledon
 ATP Masters 1000
 ATP 500
 ATP 250
 ATP Finals
 WTA Tour
 ATP Cup

Motosport
 Formula 1
 Formula 2
 Formula 3
 Moto GP (Except in Slovenia)
 Moto 2 (Except in Slovenia)
 Moto 3 (Except in Slovenia)
 NASCAR
 Speedway

American football
 Champions League
 CEFL
 Serbian National League

Volleyball
 Polish PlusLiga
 Italian Men's Volleyball League
 Italian Women's Volleyball League
 Turkish Men's Volleyball League
 Turkish Women's Volleyball League
 Slovenian Men's Volleyball League
 Slovenian Women's Volleyball League
 Slovakian Men's Volleyball League
 Slovakian Women's Volleyball League
 German Bundesliga
 Men's Nations League
 Women's Nations League

Ice hockey 
 NHL
 KHL

Handball
 EHF Cup
 Hungarian League
 Slovenian First League

Athletics
 Diamond League

Water polo
 LEN Champions League

Nova Sport 

On 4 December 2019, The United Group launched a secondary sports channel named Nova Sport.

References

External links
 Official Site
 Official Site of Sport Klub Serbia
 Official Site of Sport Klub Slovenia
 Official Site of Sport Klub Croatia

Sports television networks
Sports television in Poland
Sports television in Bosnia and Herzegovina
Sports television in Croatia
Sports television in Serbia
Sports television in Slovenia
Television channels and stations established in 2006